Bao Bolong  (also Baobolong, Bao Bolon or Baobolon) Wetland Reserve is a national park in The Gambia. Established in 1996 it covers 220 square kilometres.

The Wetland Reserve is located on the north bank of the River Gambia, approximately 100 km (52 nautical miles) from the river mouth. The name is derived from the Bao Bolon tributary that rises in Senegal and enters the River Gambia. It extends from the River Gambia north to the Senegalese border along the Baobolon tributary.

History 
On 1 January 1993, an area of 35 km² was first declared as Bao Bolong National Reserve. From 16 September 1996 on, it has covered an extended area of 220 km² (200 km² according to other sources). It was the first reserve in the Gambia to be acknowledged as a wetland area worthy of protection according to the Ramsar Convention. Since 1975, this convention, whose draft had been initiated by the United Nations Educational, Scientific and Cultural Organization (UNESCO), protects the habitat of water birds and Charadriiformes. For other nature reserves in the country, such as Tanbi Wetland Complex or Niumi National Park (NNP), a Ramsar acknowledgement is also being aimed at by the Gambian authorities. As with NNP, it is intended to extend Bao Bolong Wetland Reserve across the border and to jointly administrate the area with Senegalese authorities.

Geography 
The reserve features a length of 22 kilometres and an approximate width of nine km. The western part is located in the Central Baddibu district while the eastern part adheres to Upper Baddibu, both of which belonging to the North Bank Division.

Chiefly, the reserve is made up of the river Bao Bolong's estuary, one of the bigger tributaries of the river Gambia. It is located about 100 km away from the Gambia's mouth into Atlantic Ocean. The roughly 100 km long Bao Bolong river's spring is situated in Senegal. Furthermore, BBWR includes the rivers Salokini Bolong, Mandon Bolong, Duntu Malang Bolong, Tanku Bolong and Katchang Bolong.

The Gambia river thereby formes the southern boundary of the protected area. Approximately two kilometres away on the opposite bank of the river, the roughly 115 km² large Kiang West National Park is located. A some two and a half kilometres wide zone of dense mangrove forest adjoines to the river. To the west lies the town of Salikenne (population about 4,000), which is also located near the Dobo Forest Park of 7.32 km². At the western border, the Jalabiro Forest Park of 0.59 km² can moreover be found.

The northern edge is bordered by the north bank road, Gambia's secondmost important highway. Along this road and the fork to Salikenne, several smaller towns like Nja Kunda, Minti Kunda, Kekuta Kunda, No Kunda, Konti Kunda Sukoto, Konti Kunda Nji and Illiassa are situated. In the east, following a fork of nine km length from the north bank road, the town of Katchang of 1,700 residents can be reached. Farafenni, with a population of more than 30,000 being the division's largest city, lies roughly 18 km outside the outer limits of  BBWR to the east. Summed up, there are 25 small towns which are situated at the wetland reserve's boundaries, one among them being inside the park limits proper. The inhabitants of these towns conduct fishery for personal requirements and their stock graze inside BBWR. Furthermore, they collect timber and fire wood there.

The terrain is flat, the highest elevation is cited with 12 metres above mean sea level.

Flora and fauna

Ecosystems 

Bao Bolong Wetland Reserve includes a rich fauna and flora within multiple ecosystems. Important, protected tree species are pointed out by the "Ramsar Information Sheet", such as Pterocarpus erinaceus, Parinari macrophylla, the ana tree, wild mango trees (Cordyla africana) and Néré (Parkia biglobosa).

Mangroves 
Only in the mangrove forest of Bao Bolong Wetland Reserve the mangrove trees of the Senegambia region reach a height of 20 metres. The species Rhizophora racemosa, red mangrove (Rhizophora mangle) and black mangrove (Avicennia germinans) are widespread among them.

Salt marshes 
In the salt marshes, e.g. the succulent Sesuvium portulacastrum and grasses likeSporobolus spicatus, Paspalum vaginatum as well as Diplachne fusca can be found. In the savanna, which at times is flooded, Phragmites karka, Echinochloa pyramidalis and paper reed are very common.

Savannah 
In the savannah, trees like Daniellia oliveri, Terminalia albida, Bombax costatum and others are to be found. Among the shrubs one will encounter several species of figs, Physostigma thonningii, Terminalia avicennoides, Anthostema senegalense and Nauclea latifolia. As of grasses, Andropogon tectorum and Gamba grass (Andropogon gayanus), Beckeropsis uniseta and Pennisetum subangustum are common.

Avifauna 

The Gambia is frequently visited by ornithologists as more than 540 species of birds have been described there in topic literature. Bao Bolong Wetland Reserve is one of the major targets for tourists and scientists who intend to explore the Gambia's manifold avifauna. Among the birds of BBWR, which include 268 species of 62 families, the Ramsar Information Sheet exemplarily lists the following:

Typical for a wetland, BBWR is the habitat of many water birds, which also include geese. Among them comb duck (Sarkidiornis melanotos), spur-winged goose (Plectropterus gambensis), white-faced whistling duck (Dendrocygna viduata), garganey (Anas querquedula), northern pintail (Anas acuta), African pygmy goose (Nettapus auritus) and the northern shoveler (Anas clypeata).

The Aequornithes are represented by birds like western reef heron (Egretta gularis), little egret (Egretta garzetta), woolly-necked stork (Ciconia episcopus), hammerkop (Scopus umbretta), squacco heron (Ardeola ralloides), little bittern (Ixobrychus minutus), Goliath heron (Ardea goliath), great egret (Ardea alba), marabou (Leptoptilos crumeniferus), night heron (Nycticorax nycticorax), grey heron (Ardea cinerea), cattle egret (Bubulcus ibis) and the sacred ibis (Threskiornis aethiopicus). With their long legs, many of these birds search the river banks for food. Of this group, the pink-backed pelican (Pelecanus rufescens) and African darter (Anhinga rufa) also live within the BBWR.

The brackish water areas feature Charadriidae. Spur-winged lapwing (Hoplopterus spinosus), little stint (Calidris minuta) and common sandpiper (Actitis hypoleucos) can be found.

Among the colourful family of kingfishers, which preferably occur near open water, the woodland kingfisher, pied kingfisher (Ceryle rudis), swallow-tailed bee-eater (Merops hirundineus), giant kingfisher (Ceryle maxima), malachite kingfisher (Alcedo cristata) and the blue-breasted kingfisher (Halcyon malimbica) are notable.

Equally colourful are the west African examples of starlings. Among them, the violet-backed starling (Cinnyricinclus leucogaster) and the long-tailed glossy-starling (Lamprotornis caudatus) can be found inside the Bao Bolong Wetland Reserve.

The Coraciiformes include the Abyssinian ground-hornbill (Bucorvus abyssinicus) and the European roller (Coracias garrulus).

Also species of parrots can be found in west Africa, among them are the Senegal parrot (Poicephalus senegalus) and the rose-ringed parakeet (Psittacula krameri).

The birds of prey include species like African fish eagle (Haliaeetus vocifer), red-necked buzzard (Buteo auguralis) and black kite (Milvus migrans) as well as the bateleur (Terathopius ecaudatus).

Moreover, African mourning doves (Streptopelia decipiens) of the genus Streptopelia and the little swift (Apus affinis) from the swift family have been spotted.

Fish and other water animals 
Among BBWR's ichthyofauna, some fish are noted in the "Ramsar Information Sheet": Ethmalosa fimbriata, barracudas (Sphyraena sp.), Polydactylus quadrifilis, Arius latiscutatus, Pseudotolithus elongatus, Pomadasys perotaei and Pseudotolithus bracygnathus. Also tilapia (Tilapia) and mullets (Mugilidae) occur in these waters.
Furthermore, a type of oyster, Crassostrea gasar and blue crab (Callinectes sapidus) can be found.

The West African manatee (Trichechus senegalensis), a mammal, lives in the water between the mangroves and is categorized as an endangered species.

Moreover, the West African Crocodile (Crocodylus suchus) is a common species of reptile.

Mammals 
Thirty-two species of mammals are known, the "Ramsar Information Sheet" lists the African clawless otter (Aonyx capensis), which is common to the area. Several species of antelopes like sitatunga (Tragelaphus spekeii), bushbuck (Tragelaphus scriptus) and the duiker (Cephalophinae) as well as warthogs (Phacochoerus africanus).

Among the predators, the spotted hyena (Crocuta crocuta) is common. Also leopards (Panthera pardus) are attributed to the BBWR.

The primates, according to the "Ramsar Information Sheet", include the red colobus (Piliocolobus), the patas monkey (Erythrocebus patas) and green monkeys (Chlorocebus). But also the Guinea baboon (Papio papio) and the Senegal bushbaby (Galago senegalensis) can be found.

Tourism 
The area is only moderately used for tourism. Ecotourism, including bird watching and common observations of nature, shall be further developed though. Next to this, boat tours through the mangroves are conducted.

Climate change

In 2022, the IPCC Sixth Assessment Report included Bao Bolong Wetland Reserve in the list of African natural heritage sites which would be threatened by flooding and coastal erosion by the end of the century, but only if climate change followed RCP 8.5, which is the scenario of high and continually increasing greenhouse gas emissions associated with the warming of over 4°C., and is no longer considered very likely. The other, more plausible scenarios result in lower warming levels and consequently lower sea level rise: yet, sea levels would continue to increase for about 10,000 years under all of them. Even if the warming is limited to 1.5°C, global sea level rise is still expected to exceed  after 2000 years (and higher warming levels will see larger increases by then), consequently exceeding 2100 levels of sea level rise under RCP 8.5 (~ with a range of ) well before the year 4000.

References

Further reading 
 Emms, Craig; Linda Barnett, Richard Human. The Gambia, 2nd: The Bradt Travel Guide (Bradt Travel Guide). Bradt Travel Guides, 2006, 
 Cartes ITM: Gambia Map, Estate Publications, 2003,

External links 
 The Annotated Ramsar List of Wetlands of International Importance: Baobolon Wetland Reserve
 Description of flora, fauna & avifauna with photos Access Gambia
 Description by BirdLife International
 Bao Bolong Wetland Reserve
 Bao Bolong Wetland Reserve by Momodou Camara
 Bao Bolong Wetland Reserve

National parks of the Gambia
Protected areas established in 1996
Ramsar sites in the Gambia